Severočeši.cz is a regionalist political party in the Czech Republic. It operates in the Ústecký Region of northern Bohemia.

The party won two seats in the Senate in the 2010 election: Jaroslav Doubrava in Ústí nad Labem and Alena Dernerová in Most.

External links
 Severočeši.cz official website

Political parties in the Czech Republic
Populism in the Czech Republic
Regionalist parties in the Czech Republic
Political parties established in 2008
2008 establishments in the Czech Republic